Terenure Cricket Club, formerly CYM Cricket Club (standing for Catholic Young Men's Society) is a cricket club in Dublin, Republic of Ireland, playing in Division 2 of the Leinster Senior League.

The club was established in 1910 as part of the sporting section of the St Kevin's Catholic Young Men's Society (which had been formed in 1904), joining the Minor League in 1912 and the Intermediate League after the First World War. In 1923, CYM won promotion to the Junior League and moved to their current ground at Terenure.

References

External links
Terenure Cricket Club

Cricket clubs in County Dublin
Leinster Senior League (cricket) teams
1910 establishments in Ireland
Sports clubs in South Dublin (county)